North Yorkshire County Council (NYCC) is the county council governing the non-metropolitan county of North Yorkshire; an area composing most of North Yorkshire in England. The council currently consists of 90 councillors. The council is currently controlled by the Conservative Party. The headquarters of the council is county hall in Northallerton.

In July 2021 the Ministry of Housing, Communities and Local Government announced that in April 2023, the non-metropolitan county will be reorganised into a unitary authority.  The county council will be abolished and its functions transferred to a new authority, North Yorkshire Council.

History
The council was formed in 1974 when North Riding County Council was abolished. The council occupies County Hall at Northallerton. As a County Council, it is a "top-tier" system that has the responsibility for social care, education and roads.  Until 31 March 2023 other functions are the responsibility of seven district councils.

Governance 
Until May 2022 the Council was composed of 72 councillors. Elections were held every four years, except in 2021. The 2017 election returned an increased Conservative majority, with the Conservative Party holding 55 seats. Independent candidates saw an increase to 10 seats, with the Liberal Democrats and Labour seeing large reductions in their seat counts. UKIP and the Liberal Party both lost their representation on the council, with the Liberal Party incumbent in Pickering losing by just 2 votes. 

Across the 2017–2022 period of governance, the Conservative Party saw a net loss of 4 seats, and their  governing majority was 30 by 2022.

The number of councillors was increased to 90 in 2022, and the last election was held in May 2022.  The 2022 election returned a much reduced Conservative majority, with the Conservative Party holding 47 seats. Independent candidates saw an increase to 13 seats and the Liberal Democrats and Labour increased their seats to 12 each. The Greens won representation with 5 seats and the Liberal Party regained its representation on the council with 1 seat.

Since the May 2022 election the Conservative Party has lost 1 seat to the Liberal Democrats, reducing the Conservatives' overall majority to 2 seats.

Executive 

North Yorkshire County Council's executive is composed of nine Conservative councillors and the Conservative Leader of the council. The Executive makes most decisions, except for decisions about the budget and major policy framework, which are made by the full council.

Districts
Until 31 March 2023 the seven district councils in North Yorkshire council area are:
Selby
Borough of Harrogate
Craven
Richmondshire
Hambleton
Ryedale
Borough of Scarborough
These district councils are responsible for local planning and building control, local roads, council housing, environmental health, markets and fairs, refuse collection and recycling, cemeteries and crematoria, leisure services, parks, and tourism.

The functions of the district councils will be transferred to the new North Yorkshire Council on 1 April 2023.

Political control 

Political control of the non-metropolitan county has been held by the following groups:

The last elections to the county council took place on 5 May 2022.  On 17 March 2022 the government legislated to increase the number of councillors from 72 to 90 and to reorganise the electoral divisions.  The councillors elected will serve until May 2027, one year as county councillors for the existing North Yorkshire County Council and another four years as councillors for the new unitary North Yorkshire Council when it begins in April 2023.

References

External links
North Yorkshire County Council

Heraldry website explaining the Coat of Arms

County councils of England
1974 establishments in England
Local education authorities in England
Local authorities in North Yorkshire
Major precepting authorities in England
Leader and cabinet executives
2023 disestablishments in England
Organizations disestablished in 2023
Organizations established in 1974